The Billy Horne Farm is a historic farm and national historic district located near Polkton, Anson County, North Carolina.  It includes four contributing buildings and two contributing sites.  They include a two-story weatherboard frame house in the Federal and vernacular Greek Revival style (c. 1830); a 19th-century frame overseer / tenant house; a 19th-century corncrib / granary; a 19th-century carriage house; the farm landscape; and the Horne Family Cemetery.

It was listed on the National Register of Historic Places in 1989.

References

Historic districts on the National Register of Historic Places in North Carolina
Farms on the National Register of Historic Places in North Carolina
Greek Revival houses in North Carolina
Houses completed in 1830
Buildings and structures in Anson County, North Carolina
National Register of Historic Places in Anson County, North Carolina
1830 establishments in North Carolina